Pudhiavan is a 1984 Indian Tamil-language film directed by Ameerjan and produced by Kavithalayaa Productions. The film stars Murali, Anitha, Raveendran and N. Viswanathan. It was released on 18 August 1984.

Plot

Cast 

Murali as Manohar "Mano" and Kishore
Anitha as Revathy
Raveendran as Prakash
N. Viswanathan as M. D. Viswanathan
Delhi Ganesh as Dhananjayan
Mohanapriya as Elizabeth
Vaani as Sundari
Indira Devi
Sulochana
Ramani
R. Sundaramoorthy
Veera Raghavan
Sudhan
Babu
Kumaresh
Suresh
Mahendravarman
S. Kumar
Rajeev in Friendly Appearance
Achamillai Gopi in Friendly Appearance
Poovilangu Mohan in Friendly Appearance
Charle in Friendly Appearance
Arundathi in Friendly Appearance
Agalya in Friendly Appearance
Gangai Amaran in Friendly Appearance
Vairamuthu in Friendly Appearance
N. R. Kittu n Friendly Appearance

Soundtrack 
The music was composed by V. S. Narasimhan, with lyrics by Vairamuthu.

References

External links 
 

1984 films
1980s Tamil-language films
Films directed by Ameerjan
Films scored by V. S. Narasimhan